MSC Sabrina is a container ship built in South Korea in 1989 and registered in Panama. She is managed by Mediterranean Shipping Company S.A.

She was involved in a collision off the coast of the Netherlands on June 13, 2000, with a fishing vessel, Concordia, and 15 minutes later, with a United Kingdom-registered refrigerated ship, Wintertide.

On March 8, 2008, during a snowstorm, she ran aground near Trois-Rivières, Canada.

On February 4, 2017, she was detained during a Port State Control in Antwerp and only released after 136 days.

References 

Container ships
1988 ships